Edward William Fehling (1880-1957) was a Michigan politician and a member of the Michigan State Senate from 1935 to 1938, representing the old 15th District.

Background and personal information
Fehling was born to Otto and Helen Fehling on June 27, 1880, in Watertown, Wisconsin. On June 7, 1908, he married Mary G. Boyle. He died in Clinton County, Michigan on August 10, 1957.

Political and professional career
From 1915 to 1920, Fehling was the prosecuting attorney for Clinton County. He served in the Michigan State Senate from 1935 to 1938, and was a delegate to the 1936 Republican National Convention. In 1938, he was an unsuccessful candidate for the Republican nomination for Lieutenant Governor of Michigan. He was also an unsuccessful candidate for the nomination for Circuit Court Judge in 1941.

Fehling worked as a director and attorney for the Farmers State Savings Bank, and for the State Bank of St. Johns in St. Johns, Michigan. He was a member of the Freemasons, the Knights Templar, the Order of the Eastern Star, the Odd Fellows and the Grange.

References

Politicians from Watertown, Wisconsin
People from Clinton County, Michigan
Republican Party Michigan state senators
1880 births
1957 deaths
20th-century American politicians